The First Methodist Church is a historic Methodist church building at 75 Walnut Street in Clinton, Massachusetts.  It is an L-shaped stone and stucco structure, two stories in height, with a steeply pitched slate roof.  The ground floor is finished in uncoursed fieldstone.  One entrance is set recessed behind a segmented stone arch at the southern end of the main facade, with a second entrance at the projecting gable at the northern end.  The church was designed by Woodbury and Stuart of Boston, and construction of the building was begun in 1927 for a congregation established in 1830.  The complete plan for the building was never realized due to a lack of funding, and only the community center and rectory were completed.  These were used by the congregation, the community center space acting as sanctuary, until the 1980s.  The building was rehabilitated in 1988, and how houses two residences and office space.

The church was listed on the National Register of Historic Places in 1990.

See also
National Register of Historic Places listings in Worcester County, Massachusetts

References

Churches on the National Register of Historic Places in Massachusetts
United Methodist churches in Massachusetts
Colonial Revival architecture in Massachusetts
Churches completed in 1926
Churches in Worcester County, Massachusetts
National Register of Historic Places in Worcester County, Massachusetts
Buildings and structures in Clinton, Massachusetts